Ichneutica chlorodonta, also known as the Green-toothed Owlet,  is a moth of the family Noctuidae. This species is endemic to New Zealand. It is found throughout the North, South and Stewart Islands and is associated with native forest and shrubland. It can be confused with similar looking species such as I. subcyprea however I. chlorodonta can be distinguished through differences in colouration of its fore and hind wings as well as the length of the male pectinations. The life history of this species is unknown as are the host species of its larvae but adults of I. chlorodonta are on the wing from September to April.

Taxonomy 
I. chlorodonta was first described by George Hampson in 1911. The holotype specimen used by Hampson was collected in Ngāruawāhia by George Blundell Longstaff and is held by the Natural History Museum, London. In 1988 J. S. Dugdale, in his catalogue on New Zealand lepidopera, placed this species within the Graphania genus. In 2019 Robert Hoare undertook a major review of New Zealand Noctuidae species. During this review the genus Ichneutica was greatly expanded and the genus Graphania was subsumed into that genus as a synonym. As a result of this review, this species is now known as Ichneutica chlorodonta.

Description 

Hampson first described this species as follows:

This species is very variable in the marking colouration on its forewings. 

There are some species that resemble I. chlorodonta such as I. subcyprea as well as a Westland form, called by Robert Hoare in his 2019 publication, I. skelloni s.l.  I. chlorodonta differs from I. subcyprea as the male of the species has slightly longer pectinations, it has a distinctive lilac-grey to lead grey colour to the antemedian and postmedian lines, green scaling between antemedian and postmedian lines, much darker brown hindwings, and has a paler underside of the hindwings. 

The male I. chlorodonta has a wing span of between 31 and 36 mm and the female has a wingspan of between 27 and 34 mm.

Distribution 
This species is endemic to New Zealand. This species is found throughout the North, South and Stewart Islands of New Zealand.

Habitat 
I. chlorodonta inhabits native forest and shrubland.

Behaviour 
The adults of this species are on the wing from September to April.

Life history and hosts 
The life history of this species is unknown as are the host species of its larvae.

References

Hadeninae
Moths of New Zealand
Endemic fauna of New Zealand
Moths described in 1911
Taxa named by George Hampson
Endemic moths of New Zealand